Mumford is a town in the Gomoa West District of the Central Region of Ghana, near the Central regional capital Cape Coast. As of 2013, Mumford has a settlement population of 18,368 people. It is a fishing community and also celebrate Akwambo festival in first week of November every year.

See also 
 List of Railway lines and also having the best records in terms of fishing since 18s

References

External links 
 MSN Map

Populated places in the Central Region (Ghana)